Alexander "Álex" Petxarroman Eizaguirre (born 6 February 1997), sometimes referred as Álex Petxa, is a Spanish professional footballer who plays as a right back for FC Andorra, on loan from Athletic Bilbao.

Club career

Real Sociedad
Born in San Sebastián, Gipuzkoa, Basque Country, Petxarroman joined Real Sociedad's youth setup in 2010, from Antiguoko. Promoted to farm team CD Berio FT in July 2015, he made his senior debut during the campaign, in Tercera División.

On 9 August 2017, after one season with the C-team (as Berio was fully integrated into the club's structure), Petxarroman was loaned to Segunda División B side Gernika Club, for one year. Upon returning in July 2018, he was assigned to Real Sociedad's reserves also in the third division.

Petxarroman spent the most of the 2019–20 campaign sidelined due to a knee injury suffered in October 2019. He was a key component and team captain of the B's in 2020–21, playing in 20 league matches (play-offs included) and scoring twice as his side returned to Segunda División after an absence of 59 years.

On 3 June 2021, Petxarroman failed to agree a contract renewal with Real Sociedad and left the club after eleven years.

Athletic Bilbao
On 1 July 2021, Petxarroman signed a three-year contract with La Liga side Athletic Bilbao. He made his professional debut on 31 October, replacing Óscar de Marcos late into a 1–1 away draw against his former side Real Sociedad.

On 10 August 2022, Petxarroman was loaned to Segunda División newcomers FC Andorra for the season.

Career statistics

Club

References

External links

1997 births
Living people
Footballers from San Sebastián
Spanish footballers
Association football defenders
La Liga players
Segunda División players
Segunda División B players
Tercera División players
Antiguoko players
Real Sociedad C footballers
Real Sociedad B footballers
Gernika Club footballers
Athletic Bilbao footballers
FC Andorra players